Macrodontia is an American genus of long-horned beetles remarkable for their large size and for the large mandibles of the males in particular.

Taxonomy
The genus Macrodontia Lepeletier, Audinet-Serville & Lacordaire, 1830 is in some documents credited to Latreille as the authority, but this appears to be an error, possibly due to confusion arising from Latreille having been the authority for the subfamily Prioninae and the family Cerambycidae. It is a genus within the family Cerambycidae, subfamily Prioninae, tribe Macrodontiini.

The following species are recognised in the genus Macrodontia:
Macrodontia antonkozlovi Santos-Silva, 2016
Macrodontia batesi  Lameere, 1912 
Macrodontia castroi  Marazzi, Pavesi & Marazzi, 2008 
Macrodontia cervicornis  (Linnaeus, 1758) 
Macrodontia crenata  (Olivier, 1795) 
Macrodontia dejeanii  Gory, 1839 
Macrodontia flavipennis  Chevrolat, 1833 
Macrodontia itayensis  Simoëns, 2006 
Macrodontia jolyi Bleuzen, 1994 
Macrodontia marechali  Bleuzen, 1990 
Macrodontia mathani  Pouillaude, 1915 
Macrodontia zischkai  Tippmann, 1960

Description
The species are large. Some are giants among insects, with occasional specimens more than 17 cm long. 
The habitus is fairly typical of the Cerambycidae, except for the enormous jaws of the males: elongated, more or less parallel-sided beetles with dorsiventrally flattened bodies, generally all brown or orange with longitudinal dark striping. 
The males are larger than the females and generally have enormous jaws, from which the generic name derives: Macrodontia is from the Greek μάκρος (makros) meaning "long or large"  and ὀδόντος, (odontos) meaning "of a tooth".

In contrast, in proportion to the beetles' size, the antennae are shorter than those of typical Cerambycidae.

Distribution
The genus was originally described from South America, but the 11 currently recognised species variously range from regions between  Guatemala at the north of Central America, or even Southern Mexico, to Argentina in South America.

References

 Bleuzen (P.), 1994 - The Beetles of the World, volume 21. Prioninae 1: Macrodontini (Cerambycidae). Sciences Nat, Venette 
 Marazzi & Pavesi, 2008 - Genus Macrodontia (Cerambycidae), Natura Ed.
 Simoëns (H), 2006 - Un nouveau Macrodontia originaire du Pérou (Cerambycidae), Cahiers Magellanes, 62

External links
 List of Macrodontia species
 Gallery of Macrodontia-species

Prioninae
Beetles of South America
Taxa named by Amédée Louis Michel le Peletier
Taxa named by Jean Guillaume Audinet-Serville